MG Bus Station (MGBS) metro station is an interchange metro station between Red Line and Green Line of the Hyderabad Metro.

History 
It was opened on 24 September 2018.

Facilities 
It is even bigger than Ameerpet metro station. The commuters can switch between the LB Nagar–Miyapur and JBS–Falaknuma stretches of Hyderabad Metro Rail. MG Bus Station metro station is spread over a length of 140 metres and a width of 45 metres. The Corridor-I (Miyapur–L B Nagar) station is at the first and second floors, the Corridor-II (JBS–Falaknuma) station is in the upper, third and fourth floors.

References

External links 

 https://www.ltmetro.com/metro_stations/mg-bus-station/

Hyderabad Metro stations
2018 establishments in Telangana
Railway stations in India opened in 2018